Felipe Andrés Mora Aliaga (born 2 August 1993) is a Chilean professional footballer who plays as a striker for Major League Soccer club Portland Timbers and the Chile national team.

International career
Mora was selected for the Chile national under-20 football team which participated in the 2013 South American Youth Championship. On 23 January, he scored a goal against Ecuador in the final stage. The team went on to qualified for Turkey 2013, where he scored a goal against Iraq in the group round.

On 31 May 2018, he made his first appearance for the Chilean senior team, when he came on the pitch in the 73rd minute of the 2–3 lost friendly against Romania.
On 15 October 2019, he scored his first goal for the Chile national team in a 3–2 won friendly against Guinea.

International goals
As of match played on 8 June 2021. Scores and results list Chile's goal tally first.

Career statistics

Club

Honours
Universidad de Chile
 Primera División de Chile: 2017-C

Portland Timbers
 MLS is Back Tournament: 2020

Individual
 Primera División de Chile top scorer: (13) 2017-C

References

External links
 
 
 
 Universidad de Chile Profile

1993 births
Living people
People from Santiago
People from Santiago Province, Chile
People from Santiago Metropolitan Region
Footballers from Santiago
Association football forwards
Chilean footballers
Chilean expatriate footballers
Chile under-20 international footballers
Chile youth international footballers
Chile international footballers
Audax Italiano footballers
Universidad de Chile footballers
Cruz Azul footballers
Club Universidad Nacional footballers
Portland Timbers players
Chilean Primera División players
Segunda División Profesional de Chile players
Liga MX players
Major League Soccer players
Expatriate footballers in Mexico
Expatriate soccer players in the United States
Chilean expatriate sportspeople in Mexico
Chilean expatriate sportspeople in the United States
Chilean expatriates in Mexico
Chilean expatriates in the United States
2021 Copa América players